Joseph Keyes (born 17 September 1995) is an Ireland international rugby league footballer who plays as a  and  for the Halifax Panthers in the Betfred Championship.

He has previously played for the London Broncos in the Super League and Championship, and spent time on loan from the Broncos at the London Skolars in League 1. Keyes also played for the Bradford Bulls in third tier and the RFL Championship and Hull Kingston Rovers in the Betfred Super League. He spent time on loan from Hull KR at the York City Knights and Bradford in the second tier.

Background
Keyes was born in Enfield, London, England and is the son of London Broncos player welfare manager John Keyes.

Playing career

London Broncos
Keyes made his début for the London Broncos in the Super League against the Widnes Vikings in 2014.

On the 17th August 2014, London Broncos were 22 points behind early in the second half against Leeds, but fought back to claim their first win in 11 months with Keyes scoring a hat-trick in a man of the match performance. That was the London clubs only win of the 2014 season.

The 2015 season in the Championship saw the London side field 11 homegrown players over the season including Dollapi, Magrin, Macani, Wicks, Thomas, Everett, Burnett, D Williams, M Davis, Walker and Keyes but the club finished in the bottom half of the Championship and it seemed only Walker and Davis were ever likely to play at a higher level.

In 2016, Andrew Henderson signed half-backs Israel Eliab, William Barthau and Scott Leatherbarrow at the start of the season, plus Api Pewhairangi in May and Keyes was perhaps fourth or five choice for just two positions, and he pushed to leave the club.

The Ireland international played 28 games for the London Broncos, with about seven appearances in the Super League with the rest in the Championship between 2014 and 2016 before asking for a release.

London Skolars (DR)
Keyes spent time on dual registration in 2016 at the London Skolars.

Bradford Bulls
Rohan Smith, the Head Coach of the Bradford Bulls was waiting with a contract for 2016, 2017 and 2018 for Keyes after he left London.

Keyes played for the club in 2016 when it was in the loser's competition, the Championship Shield, then the 2017 team that finished bottom of the Championship and played in 2018 in the third tier, but which finished runner's up. He played his last season for Bradford back in the Championship.

2016 - 2016 Season

Keyes featured in the Championship Shield in Game 3 (Oldham) to Game 6 (Workington Town). He scored against Oldham (1 try, 10 goals), Dewsbury Rams (2 goals), Swinton (7 goals) and Workington Town (3 goals).

Following the Bradford clubs liquidation at the end of the season, Keyes re-signed with the new Bradford side.

2017 - 2017 Season

Keyes featured in the pre-season friendlies against Huddersfield and Keighlj. He scored against Huddersfield Giants (1 try, 1 goal) and Keighley Cougars (3 goals).

Keyes featured in Round 3 (Swinton Lions) and then in Round 5 (London Broncos). He also played in Round 7 (Dewsbury Rams) to Round 11 (Featherstone Rovers) then in Round 13 (Sheffield Eagles) to Round 16 (Dewsbury Rams). He played in Round 18 (Rochdale Hornets) to Round 23 (Swinton Lions). Keyes featured in the Championship Shield Game 1 (Toulouse Olympique) to Game 2 (Oldham) then in Game 5 (Sheffield Eagles) to Game 7 (Rochdale Hornets). Joe also played in the 2017 Challenge Cup in Round 4 (Featherstone Rovers). He scored against Featherstone Rovers (2 goals, 1 drop goal), Dewsbury Rams (5 goals), Oldham (1 try), Sheffield Eagles (2 goals), Batley Bulldogs (1 try) and Rochdale Hornets (1 try).

He signed a 2 Year extension with the Bulls at the end of the season.

2018 - 2018 Season

After recovering from a knee injury sustained at the 2017 Rugby League World Cup, Keyes featured in the pre season friendly against Dewsbury Rams and Keighley Cougars. He scored against Keighley Cougars (4 goals).

Keyes featured in Round 1 (York City Knights) to Round 8 (Doncaster R.L.F.C.) then in Round 12 (North Wales Crusaders) to Round 18 (York City Knights). He played in Round 21 (North Wales Crusaders) to Round 25 (Oldham R.L.F.C.) then in the Semi Final (Oldham R.L.F.C.) to Final (Workington Town). Keyes played in the 2018 Challenge Cup in Round 3 (West Wales Raiders) then in Round 5 (Warrington Wolves). He scored against York City Knights (5 goals), West Wales Raiders (25 goals), Keighley Cougars (2 tries, 16 goals), Hunslet R.L.F.C. (1 try, 4 goals), Oldham (1 try, 15 goals), Workington Town (1 try, 4 goals), Coventry Bears (2 tries, 6 goals), Warrington Wolves (1 try, 1 goal), Doncaster R.L.F.C. (6 goals), North Wales Crusaders (2 tries) and Whitehaven R.L.F.C. (2 tries, 1 drop goal).

At the end of the season Keyes signed a 2 Year extension with the Bulls.

2019 - 2019 Season

Joe featured in the pre-season friendlies against Halifax R.L.F.C. and Dewsbury Rams. He scored against Halifax R.L.F.C. (2 goals) and Dewsbury Rams (1 goal).

Keyes played in Round 18 (Halifax R.L.F.C.) to Round 27 (Rochdale Hornets). He scored against Halifax R.L.F.C. (4 goals), Widnes Vikings (3 tries, 9 goals), Toulouse Olympique (1 try, 3 goals), Swinton Lions (5 goals), York City Knights (2 goals), Toronto Wolfpack (4 goals), Barrow Raiders (1 try, 7 goals), Dewsbury Rams (5 goals), Sheffield Eagles (1 try, 3 goals) and Rochdale Hornets (2 tries, 10 goals).

York City Knights (loan)
On 14 Apr 2021 it was reported that he had signed for the York City Knights in the RFL Championship on a short-term loan deal.

Bradford Bulls (loan)
On 26 Jun 2021 it was reported that he had signed for the Bradford Bulls in the RFL Championship on loan.

2021 - 2021 Season

Keyes played in Round 12 (Batley Bulldogs) to Round 14 (Featherstone Rovers). He scored against Batley Bulldogs (5 goals), Oldham R.L.F.C. (3 tries, 9 goals) and Featherstone Rovers (4 goals).

Halifax
On 14 October 2021 it was reported that he had signed for Halifax in the RFL Championship
On 17 July 2022, Keyes scored four tries and kicked nine goals in Halifax's 58-10 victory over Workington Town.

Statistics
Statistics do not include pre-season friendlies.

Ireland
Keyes made his representative début for Ireland in the 2015 European Cup. He went on to make three appearances in the tournament.

In 2016 he was called up to the Ireland squad for the 2017 Rugby League World Cup European Pool B qualifiers.

He featured against Spain and Russia in Ireland's route to the World Cup.

References

External links
Hull Kingston Rovers profile
Bradford Bulls profile
London Broncos profile
2017 RLWC profile
Ireland profile

1995 births
Living people
Bradford Bulls players
English rugby league players
English people of Irish descent
Halifax R.L.F.C. players
Hull Kingston Rovers players
Ireland national rugby league team players
London Broncos players
London Skolars players
Rugby league halfbacks
Rugby league players from Greater London
York City Knights players